Zahirabad Assembly constituency is a SC reserved constituency of Telangana Legislative Assembly, India. It is one among 10 constituencies in Sangareddy district. It is part of Zahirabad Lok Sabha constituency.
K. Manik Rao, a retired RTO, is representing Telangana Rashtra Samiti for the first time defeating a long time sitting MLA and top brass Congress Leader J. Geeta Reddy.

Mandals
The Assembly Constituency presently comprises the following Mandals:

MLAs
The constituency became reserved for candidates from the Scheduled Castes for the 2009 election and thereafter. The successful candidates have been:

1957 - M. Baga Reddy, Indian National Congress (INC)
1962 - M. Baga Reddy, INC
1967 - M. Baga Reddy, INC
1972 - M. Baga Reddy, INC
1978 - M. Baga Reddy, INC
1983 - M. Baga Reddy, INC
1985 - M. Baga Reddy, INC
1989 - Patlolla Narsimha Reddy, INC
1994 - C. Baganna, Telugu Desam Party
1999 - Mohammed Fareeduddin, INC
2004 - Mohammed Fareeduddin, INC
2009 - J. Geeta Reddy, INC
2014 - J. Geeta Reddy, INC
2018 - K. Manik Rao, TRS

Election results

2014

2018

See also
 List of constituencies of Telangana Legislative Assembly

References

Assembly constituencies of Telangana
Medak district
Constituencies established in 1952
1952 establishments in India